Morethia storri, also known commonly as the  top end firetail skink or Storr's morethia, is a species of lizard in the family Scincidae. The species is endemic to Australia.

Etymology
The specific name, storri, is in honor of Australian herpetologist Glen Milton Storr.

Geographic range
M. storri is found in Northern Territory and Western Australia, Australia.

Habitat
The preferred natural habitats of M. storri are grassland, shrubland, and forest.

Reproduction
M. storri is oviparous.

References

Further reading
Cogger HG (2014). Reptiles and Amphibians of Australia, Seventh Edition. Clayton, Victoria, Australia: CSIRO Publishing. xxx + 1,033 pp. .
Greer AE (1981). "A new species of Morethia (Lacertilia: Scincidae) from northern Australia, with comments on the biology and relationships of the genus". Records of the Australian Museum 33 (2): 89–122. (Morethia storri, new species).
Wilson, Steve; Swan, Gerry (2013). A Complete Guide to Reptiles of Australia, Fourth Edition. Sydney: New Holland Publishers. 522 pp. .

Morethia
Reptiles described in 1981
Skinks of Australia
Endemic fauna of Australia
Taxa named by Allen Eddy Greer